Qullasuyu (Quechua and Aymara spelling, ; Hispanicized spellings:  Collasuyu, Kholla Suyu) was the southeastern provincial region of the Inca Empire. Qullasuyu is the region of the Qulla and related specifically to the native Qulla Quechuas who primarily resided in areas such as Cochabamba and Potosí. Most Aymara territories which are now largely incorporated into the modern South American states of northern Chile, Peru, Bolivia and the Argentine northwest were annexed during the reign of Sapa Inca Huayna Cápac in the sixteenth century.

Recently, there have been movements to form a "Greater Qullasuyu" (or Qullana Suyu Marka) which would incorporate a territory similar to the former Tawantinsuyu in extent. This ideal has been proposed by the office of the Apu Mallku and the parliament of the Qullana. Qullasuyu was the largest of the four suyu (or "quarters", the largest divisions of the Inca empire) in terms of area. This suyu encompassed the Bolivian Altiplano and much of the southern Andes, running down into northwest Argentina and as far south as the Maule river near modern Santiago, Chile. Along with Kuntisuyu, it was part of the Hurin Suyukuna or "Lower Quarters" of the empire.

Etymology 

From Quechua, composite of qulla (meaning south, but also the namesake people) and suyu (region, quarter of the Inca Empire), with the meaning of "southern region".

Wamani 
Each suyu was divided into wamani, or provinces. Qullasuyu included the wamani of:

Arica or Arika
Cana or Kana
Canche or Kanche
Caranga or Karanka
Caruma
Cavina or Kawina, whose people were “Incas by privilege”
Chicha
Cochabamba or Quchapampa
Collagua
Lipe
Locumba
Lupaqa
Moquegua
Pacajes or Pacasa
Qolla Urcosuyu or Qulla Urqusuyu
Sama
Tambo or Tampu
Tarata
Ubina
Yampará or Yampara

See also 

Antisuyu
Chinchaysuyu
Kuntisuyu
Oroncota, Yampara settlement and Inca fortress in Bolivia
Organization of the Inca Empire
The Chilean Inca Trail

References 

Subdivisions of the Inca Empire